Poly ICLC is an immunostimulant. It is polyinosinic-polycytidylic acid (poly I:C) mixed with the stabilizers carboxymethylcellulose and polylysine. It is under trial for use in cancer.

Poly I:C is a ligand for toll like receptor-3, which usually triggers on the structurally similar double-stranded RNA present in some viruses.

References

External links
 National Cancer Institute: poly ICLC

Immunostimulants
Combination drugs